

M
The DST column shows the months in which Daylight Saving Time, a.k.a. Summer Time, begins and ends. A blank DST box usually indicates that the location stays on Standard Time all year, although in some cases the location stays on Summer Time all year. If a location is currently on DST, add one hour to the time in the Time column. There are 645 IATA airport codes beginning with M, to be compared with the 676 (26*26) theoretical combinations of the two other letters.

Notes
  MIL is common IATA code for Milan–Malpensa Airport , Linate Airport , Il Caravaggio International Airport  and Parma Airport .
  MMA covers Malmö Airport  only.
  MOW is common IATA code for Domodedovo International Airport , Sheremetyevo International Airport  and Vnukovo International Airport .
  Morocco temporarily suspends DST for the month of Ramadan.
  Airport is located in neighboring Republic of Bashkortostan.

References

  - includes IATA codes
 
 Aviation Safety Network - IATA and ICAO airport codes
 Great Circle Mapper - IATA, ICAO and FAA airport codes

M